Results of India national football team in 2020s

2021

2022

2023

2024

See also
India national football team results (2010–2019)
India women's national football team results (2020–present)
India national football team results (unofficial matches)

References

Football
2020